Hemmatabad-e Olya (also Romanized as Hemmatābād-e ‘Olyā and Hemmat Abad Olya; also known as Hemmatābād and Hemmatābād-e Bālā) is a village in Qasemabad Rural District, in the Central District of Rafsanjan County, Kerman Province, Iran. At the 2006 census, its population was 1,582, in 380 families.

References 

Populated places in Rafsanjan County